The sargassum fish, anglerfish, or frog fish (Histrio histrio) is a frogfish of the family Antennariidae, the only species in its genus.  It lives among Sargassum seaweed which floats in subtropical oceans. The scientific name comes from the Latin histrio meaning a stage player or actor, and refers to the fish's feeding behaviour.

Description

Histrio histrio, a strange-looking fish, blends well with its surroundings in its seaweed habitat. It is laterally compressed and its length can reach . The colour of the body and the large oral cavity is very variable, but is usually mottled and spotted yellow, green, and brown on a paler background, and the fins often have several dark streaks or bands. The fish can change colour rapidly, from light to dark and back again. The body and the fins are covered with many weed-like protrusions, but other than these, the skin is smooth without dermal spines. The dorsal fin has three spines and 11–13 soft rays. The front spine is modified into a slender growth on the upper lip known as an illicium, which is tipped by a fleshy lump, the esca. The junction between the head and body is indistinct because no gill slits are present; the gills open as pores near the base of the pectoral fins. The anal fin has no spines and seven to 13 soft rays. The pelvic fins are large and the pectoral fins have 9-11 rays and are stalked and able to grip objects. The outer rays of the tail fin are simple, but the central rays are forked.

Distribution and habitat

It is found in parts of the Atlantic Ocean and the Indo-Pacific Ocean, where drifting seaweed accumulates. In the western Atlantic, it ranges from the Gulf of Maine south to Uruguay. It has been reported from northern Norway, but that sighting is likely to be as a result of its having been carried along by the North Atlantic Current.

Biology
The sargassum fish is a voracious ambush predator that is also a cannibal. One individual was dissected and found to have 16 juveniles in its stomach. It stalks its prey among the tangled weeds, relying on its cryptic camouflage for concealment. It can clamber through and cling to the seaweed stalks with its prehensile pectoral fins. It dangles its esca as a fishing lure to attract small fish, shrimp, and other invertebrates. It is able to dart forward to grab its prey by expelling water forcibly through its gill openings. It can expand its mouth to many times its original size in a fraction of a second, drawing prey in via suction, and can swallow prey larger than itself.

It is dioecious. At breeding time, the male courts the female by following her around closely. When ready to spawn, the female ascends rapidly to the surface, where she lays a mass of eggs stuck together by gelatinous mucus. This egg raft adheres to the seaweed, where it is fertilised by the male. On hatching, each larva is surrounded by an integumentary envelope and has a large, rounded head, fully formed fins, and eyes with double notches. As the larva develops into a juvenile, this envelope fuses with the skin.

This fish is preyed on by larger fish and sea birds. To avoid underwater threats, it can leap above the surface onto mats of weed. It can survive for some time out of water.

References

Antennariidae
Fish of Hawaii
Fish described in 1758
Fish of the Atlantic Ocean
Monotypic fish genera
Taxa named by Carl Linnaeus